Freadelpha is a genus of longhorn beetles of the subfamily Lamiinae, containing the following species:

subgenus Freadelpha
 Freadelpha chloroleuca Harold, 1879
 Freadelpha cinerea (Thomson, 1878)
 Freadelpha coronata (Jordan, 1896)
 Freadelpha eremita (Westwood, 1845)
 Freadelpha exigua Kolbe, 1896
 Freadelpha holoviridis Breuning, 1977
 Freadelpha principalis (Dalman, 1817)
 Freadelpha rex (Jordan, 1903)

subgenus Geloharpya
 Freadelpha amoena (Westwood, 1841)
 Freadelpha burgeoni Breuning, 1935
 Freadelpha confluens (Harold, 1879)
 Freadelpha crux-nigra (Hope, 1833)
 Freadelpha leucospila (Jordan, 1903)
 Freadelpha murrayi (Chevrolat, 1855)
 Freadelpha polyspila (Harold, 1879)
 Freadelpha vittata (Aurivillius, 1907)

References

Sternotomini